The Moultrie Packers were a class D, and class A minor league baseball team, based in Moultrie, Georgia, founded by J.S. Dillard.

History

Moultrie teams played in the Dixie League from 1916 to 1917 and the Georgia–Florida League from 1935 to 1942, 1946–1952, 1955–1957, and 1962–1963.

In 1935 they were named the Moultrie Steers before reestablishing the Packers moniker, which they used  until 1947. Their name then changed frequently until the 1963 season when they disbanded. From 1948 to 1949, the team was named the Moultrie Athletics as an affiliate of the Philadelphia Athletics. In 1950, they were renamed the Moultrie Cubs and a year later, the Moultrie To-baks. The team would be renamed the Moultrie Reds and Moultrie Giants, before merging with a team from Brunswick, Georgia in 1957, and being named the Moultrie/Brunswick Phillies. In 1962, the team finally became the Moultrie Colt .22s, after an affiliation with the Houston Colt .45s.

Overall, Moultrie had affiliations with the Houston Colt .45's (1962–1963), Philadelphia Phillies (1957), Cincinnati Redlegs (1955–1956), New York Giants (1952), Chicago Cubs (1950), Philadelphia Athletics (1948–1949), Pittsburgh Pirates (1941–1942), Philadelphia Phillies (1939–1940), Boston Red Sox (1937) and Chicago White Sox (1935–1936)

The ballpark

Moultrie teams played at Holmes Memorial Park. Today, Colquitt County High School is at the site, located at 1800 Park Ave SE, Moultrie, GA 31768. Colquitt County High School's Sports teams are nicknamed the "Packers."

Moultrie's minor league baseball team played in the old wooden stadium where Mack Thorpe stadium is now. In about 1946 I went to games there with my Dad, Charlie Powell Sr. My favorite player was 1st baseman, Ken Rhynn (sp).

Notable alumni

 Joe Azcue (1956) MLB All-Star

Gene Bearden (1939) 1948 AL ERA Title

 Tex Hughson (1937) 3 x MLB All-Star

Bill Voiselle (1938) MLB All-Star

References

Defunct minor league baseball teams
Baseball teams established in 1916
Baseball teams disestablished in 1963
Boston Red Sox minor league affiliates
Chicago White Sox minor league affiliates
Philadelphia Phillies minor league affiliates
Philadelphia Athletics minor league affiliates
Pittsburgh Pirates minor league affiliates
Professional baseball teams in Georgia (U.S. state)
1916 establishments in Georgia (U.S. state)
1963 disestablishments in Georgia (U.S. state)
Colquitt County, Georgia
Defunct baseball teams in Georgia